Saint Maonacan, otherwise Manchan (fl. A.D. 500) of Athleague ("the stony-ford of St. Manchan" or "ford of flagstones"), was an early Irish Christian saint. He founded a church in Athleague, in county Roscommon. Saint Manchan's feast day is celebrated on February 18 (February 7 in the Old Calendar), by Roman Catholics, and Anglicans. The life of Manchan of Athleague is obscured because many persons named Manchan are to be found among the monastically-inclined medieval Irish Christians.

Life
Nothing is known about the life of Manchán of Athleague. The period of this saint is unknown. He founded an early Christian monastery of Athleague, in county Roscommon. Moran (2010), provides the following local perspective:-

 "Another saint, Fionn Monganan is recorded as the true patron saint of Athleague and the village was known as Athliag Monganan in the earliest annals. His powers of keeping pestilence and disease at bay is also remembered and the site of his hallowed cell is near the present Angling Centre beside the former ford."

The sanctity of Manchán of Athleague is first recorded in the Annals of the Four Masters which records "A.D. 1493, .. ", which confirms he was patron saint of Athleague, in County Roscommon. The "Martyrology of Donegal" records the Saint as ", Maonacan, of Ath-liacc", while "The martyrology of Gorman" notes "Moenucan, of Ath liacc, Feb. 7. ".

The Annals of the Four Masters calls Athleague the medieval names of- ", and ".

Church
The Irish Annals has the following entries for the church of Atha Liacc-

 "1235.29 The church of an Druimne at Athleague was burnt, & the charters(?) & all books of the Canons", .
 "M1266.2 and Maelisa O'Hanainn, Prior of Roscommon and Athleague, died", "agus Maoil Isu Ua h-Anainn prioir Rosa Commain, & Atha Liacc, do écc".

Notes and references

Notes

Citations

Primary sources

Secondary sources

External links

Irish saints
6th-century Christian saints